A fleuron is one of several types of flower-like ornament used in various areas of art and design, including:

 Fleuron (architecture), an architectural element
 Fleuron (typography), a typographical element ❦, ❧ or ☙ 
 Fleuron (bookbinding), an element in gold-tooled bindings
 The Fleuron, a British journal of typography
 , Danish novelist